Nesterkovo is a rural locality (a village) in Vtorovskoye Rural Settlement, Kameshkovsky District, Vladimir Oblast, Russia. The population was 72 as of 2010.

Geography 
Nesterkovo is located 34 km southwest of Kameshkovo (the district's administrative centre) by road. Karyakino is the nearest rural locality.

References 

Rural localities in Kameshkovsky District
Vladimirsky Uyezd